Dhirubhai Ambani Knowledge CITY, often abbreviated as DAKC, is a technology park located at Kopar Khairane in Navi Mumbai, India. Spread over 56 hectares, it was completed in 2002. The city is named after the famous Indian industrialist Dhirubhai Ambani and is owned by the Reliance ADA Group and houses a 24-hour National Network Operations Centre (NNOC) along with more than 25,000 employees working primarily for the Reliance Communications division.

History
This site was earlier owned by ICI and housed the first polyester staple fibre plant in India. Upon acquisition by Reliance, the site was renamed Terene Fibres India Pvt. Ltd (TFIPL). Production facilities at the plant had been moved out of this l

Facilities
The Campus is partially Wi-Fi enabled (I Block is a complete hot spot) with two HDFC Bank ATMs and one ICICI Bank ATM located therein. There is also an HDFC Bank branch located within the campus.

Other than this, the campus has a huge artificial lake where migratory birds can be found at times. There are temples, fountains, medical facilities, a parking lot for over 500 cars, and a helipad within the campus.

Places named after Dhirubhai Ambani
 Dhirubhai Kokilaben Dhirubhai Ambani Nursing College (KDA-NC) Ambani Knowledge Center
 Dhirubhai Ambani Knowledge Center, Surat
 Dhirubhai Ambani Institute of Information and Communication Technology - Gujarat
 Dhirubhai Ambani Solar Park - Jaisalmer district
 Dhirubhai Ambani International School - Mumbai
 Reliance Institute of Life Sciences - Mumbai
 Reliance Anil Dhirubhai Ambani Group
 Kokilaben Dhirubhai Ambani Hospital & Medical Research Institute - Mumbai
 Kokilaben Dhirubhai Ambani Nursing College (KDA-NC) - Mumbai
 Kokilaben Ambani Hospital Guwahati Centre, Guwahati
 Kokilaben Dhirubhai Ambani vidyamandir, Jamnagar
 Dhirubhai Ambani Hospital, Lodhivali, Raigad district
 Dhirubhai Ambani Memorial - Chorvad
 Jamnaben Hirachand Ambani School, Raigad
 Krishna Godavari Basin Dhirubhai Ambani Block -6

References

Navi Mumbai
Reliance Group
Software technology parks in India
Economy of Navi Mumbai
2002 establishments in Maharashtra